The Sri Lanka People's Freedom Alliance (abbreviated SLPFA;) was a political alliance led by the Sri Lanka Podujana Peramuna formed in 2019. Initially, the alliance consisted of the Sri Lanka Podujana Peramuna (SLPP), the Sri Lanka Freedom Party (SLFP) and fifteen smaller parties.

Since 5 April 2022, the alliance has been functionally dissolved, after many of the SLPP's former allies left the SLFPA to join the opposition amidst the 2019–present Sri Lankan economic crisis and 2022 Sri Lankan political crisis.

History
On 31 October, 2019, seventeen parties including the SLPP and SLFP signed an agreement at the Sri Lanka Foundation Institute in Colombo to form the Sri Lanka People's Freedom Alliance. The seventeen parties included:

The alliance supported SLPP candidate Gotabaya Rajapaksa in the 2019 presidential election. It had planned to contest the 2020 parliamentary election under the chair symbol, the symbol of a previous SLFP-led alliance, the People's Alliance. However, in February 2020 the alliance chose to contest the election under the flower bud symbol of the SLPP.

On 5 April 2022, amidst the 2019–present Sri Lankan economic crisis and 2022 Sri Lankan political crisis, many of the SLPP's former allies left the SLFPA to join the opposition.

Electoral history

Notes

References

External links

 
2019 establishments in Sri Lanka
Political parties established in 2019
2022 disestablishments in Sri Lanka
Political parties disestablished in 2022
Left-wing nationalist parties